was a village located in Nishishirakawa District, Fukushima Prefecture, Japan.

On November 7, 2005, Omotegō, along with the villages of Higashi and Taishin (all from Nishishirakawa District) was merged into the expanded city of Shirakawa.

As of 2003, the village had an estimated population of 7,322 and a density of 110.14 persons per km². The total area was 66.48 km².

External links
 Shirakawa official website 

Dissolved municipalities of Fukushima Prefecture